King of Prism: Pride the Hero is a 2017 Japanese animated film produced by Tatsunoko Production and Avex Pictures based on Takara Tomy's Pretty Rhythm franchise. The story focuses on side characters from the animated television series Pretty Rhythm: Rainbow Live, which aired from 2013 to 2014, and is a direct sequel to the 2016 film King of Prism by Pretty Rhythm. A sequel titled King of Prism: Shiny Seven Stars was released in 2019.

Plot

Schwarz Rose has seized copyrights to "Pride" and registered it as Louis Kisaragi's song for the Prism King Cup, rendering Hiro Hayami unable to use it unless Edel Rose pays . Kazuki Nishina appoints Taiga Kougami as his successor while he trains with Rei Kurokawa. Edel Rose later discovers that Koji Mihama is composing music for Schwarz Rose's newest talent, Joji Takadanobaba. Hiro goes to the United States to confront him, while Kazuki trains under Rei's guidance. Edel Rose's janitor Ryo Yamada, a former Prism Star whose career was crushed by Jin through scandal, trains the rest of the Edel Rose students for the Prism King Cup.

At night, Louis invites Shin Ichijo out and asks him to open the locket he gave him, revealing a photo of Shine. While performing a Prism Show together, Louis' "Whispering Lunamystic Heaven" Prism Jump ends with him confessing his feelings and kissing Shin before stabbing him. Shin awakens at Edel Rose, believing it to be a dream. Meanwhile, Hiro is forced to move on without Koji's help. Jin accosts Hijiri Himuro and beckons June Amou to follow him, determined to steal everything from him. Within the next week, Edel Rose becomes embroiled in scandal. Despite these hardships, Hijiri reveals to Hiro that Jin had grown so jealous of Hijiri's career as a Prism Star that he permanently injured his leg, ending with him promising to help Hiro. Later, Hiro's mother and the other Edel Rose students show their support, with Yu and Ito giving him another one of Koji's songs to use. Hijiri later announces that he will be registering Taiga, Yukinojo Tachibana, and Hiro for the Prism King Cup, but Yukinojo withdraws and asks to be replaced with Shin, despite Shin having lost his ability to perform Prism Jumps.

The Prism King Cup begins its Thunder Storm Session, and points are gathered through the Prism System with watches developed by Juuouin Holdings that analyze the emotions of the audience. Joji earns 14450 karats and puts Schwarz Rose in the lead, partially due to Jin bribing the judges and planting Schwarz Rose affiliates in the audience. Alexander destroys the stadium out of scorn for academy-style Prism Shows and challenges Kazuki to another duel. Taiga intervenes, leading both to be disqualified. Kazuki performs "Freedom" and restores the stadium and the audience's excitement, but he is also disqualified. While Shin performs "Over the Sunshine!", Louis tears off his earring and gives him the ability to do Prism Jumps again. Shin's performance is well received, but only earns 14380 karats, placing him in 2nd. Instead of performing "Pride", Louis performs "Lunatic Destiny." His "Infinite Hug Eternal" Prism Jump returns June's memories from Pretty Rhythm: Rainbow Live, including one revealing that Louis is also a Rinne-type Prism Messenger, while Shin was Shine, Rinne's lover, before she was forced to kill him. Having been the first to successfully perform four consecutive Prism Jumps at the Prism King Cup, Louis earns 20000 karats and is placed in 1st.

Instead of using the song Yu and Ito gave him, Hiro performs "Pride" and amazes the audience, even causing the Prism Goddess to crown him as king. Hiro earns 20000 karats and is tied with Louis, but before the final results are announced, Sanada destroys the monitor. However, Kakeru Juuouin reveals that Juuouin Holdings has partnered with the Itsutomo Group to improve the Prism System's security and have backed up the points, while Louis allows Hiro to take the win. With Edel Rose victorious, Koji tells Kazuki and Hiro that his contract in Hollywood is over, and Over the Rainbow can reunite again. Having received her memories back, June returns to Hijiri, while Louis vows to stay with Jin despite his feelings for Shin.

The credits reveal that Edel Rose is able to recover from scandal, while their students carry out their lives. In a post-credits scene, Over the Rainbow performs "Nijiiro Crown" as they graduate from Edel Rose and Kakyoin Academy.

Cast

 Tetsuya Kakihara - Koji Mihama
 Tomoaki Maeno - Hiro Hayami
 Toshiki Masuda - Kazuki Nishina
 Junta Terashima - Shin Ichijo
 Soma Saito - Yukinojo Tachibana
 Tasuku Hatanaka - Taiga Kougami
 Taku Yashiro - Kakeru Juuouin
 Takuma Nagatsuka - Leo Saionji
 Masashi Igarashi - Minato Takahashi
 Yuma Uchida - Yu Suzuno
 Shouta Aoi - Louis Kisaragi
 Shunsuke Takeuchi - Alexander Yamato
 Tomokazu Sugita - Joji Takadanobaba
 Takayuki Kobayashi - Joji Takadanobaba (singing voice)
 Toshihiko Seki - Hijiri Himuro
 Daisuke Namikawa - Ryo Yamada
 Showtaro Morikubo - Rei Kurokawa
 Shinichiro Miki - Jin Norizuki
 Ayane Sakura - Rinne
 Emiri Kato - Naru Ayase
 Yu Serizawa - Ann Fukuhara
 Mikako Komatsu - Ito Suzuno
 Haruka Tomatsu - Bell Renjoji
 Saori Goto - Otoha Takanashi
 Maaya Uchida - Wakana Morizono
 Rumi Shishido - June Amou
 Mitsuki Saiga - Shine

Production

King of Prism: Pride the Hero was announced in 2016 for a June 2017 release. The story's main conflict was originally shown through a post-credits scene after King of Prism by Pretty Rhythm, which served as a preview on what the staff had planned to do with the plot as they were uncertain about the first film's financial success. A sequel was not originally planned, but after the overwhelming success of the first film, Avex Pictures greenlit the sequel.

For Pride the Hero, Mazakazu Hishida focused on battle elements that would entertain the male viewers, most notably Alexander and Taiga's Prism Show battle. Taiga's Prism Jump, where he would summon a fan to blow away Alexander's attack, was specifically created for the audience to mimic during cheer screenings. Louis' "Lunatic Destiny" routine used motion capture from a pole dancer, a first for the CGI team, as they had to hire a pole dancer and equipment. The staff spent two months deciding how Louis' clothing was going to move during the routine.

Shortly after King of Prism: Pride of Hero'''s announcement, Emiri Kato and Ayane Sakura were reported to have reprised their roles as Naru and Rinne from Pretty Rhythm: Rainbow Live. The character Joji Takadanobaba was created specifically for Tomokazu Sugita, who had promoted King of Prism by Pretty Rhythm extensively on social media and the shows that he appeared in.King of Prism: Pride the Hero was released in theaters on June 10, 2017. The film was also screened at the Los Angeles Film Festival between September 21–23, 2018.

SequelKing of Prism: Shiny Seven Stars was announced in 2018 as both a theatrical film and television series project. The theatrical version, consisting of four feature compilation films with three episodes condensed in each, was given limited cheer screenings from March to May 2019. The television version aired on TV Tokyo beginning April 8, 2019.

Soundtrack

The original soundtrack was produced by Rei Ishizuka, and it was released on September 27, 2017 under the name . The album peaked at #5 on the Oricon Weekly Albums Chart and charted for four weeks.

Other media
A stage play adaptation summarizing both King of Prism by Pretty Rhythm and King of Prism: Pride the Hero, titled King of Prism: Over the Sunshine!'', ran at Umeda Arts Theater Drama City in Osaka from November 2–5, 2017 and AiiA 2.5 Theater Tokyo from November 8–12, 2017. The play is directed by Masanari Ujikawa. Jou Aoba and Rei Ishizuka, who had worked on the original animated film as the scriptwriter and music composer respectively, returned to work on the play. The cast consists of Shohei Hashimoto as Shin, Koji Kominami as Koji, Taishi Sugie as Hiro, Takuto Omi as Kazuki, Shojiro Yokoi as Yukinojo, Ryoki Nagae as Taiga, Yoshiki Murakami as Kakeru, Yuzuki Hoshimoto as Leo, Ryota Hirono as Yu, Taiki Naito as Louis, Spi as Alexander, and Yamato Furuya as Joji. Masashi Igarashi reprised his role as Minato from the film.

References

External links
 

2010s Japanese films
2017 anime films
Animated films based on animated series
Japanese animated films
2010s Japanese-language films
Pretty Rhythm
Tatsunoko Production